The following outline is provided as an overview of and topical guide to Dominica:

Dominica  – sovereign island nation located in the Caribbean Sea. In Latin, its name means "Sunday", which was the day on which it was discovered by Christopher Columbus.  Dominica's pre-Columbian name was Wai'tu kubuli, which means "Tall is her body".  The Carib Territory was established for the indigenous people of the island. Because the island lies between two French overseas departments, Guadeloupe to the north and Martinique to the south, and because it was colonized by France for a time, it is sometimes called "French Dominica". However, its official language is English, though a French creole is commonly spoken.  Dominica has been nicknamed the "Nature Isle of the Caribbean" for its largely unspoiled natural environment. It is one of the youngest islands in the Lesser Antilles, still being formed by geothermal-volcanic activity, as evidenced by the world's second-largest boiling lake. The island features lush mountainous rainforests, home of many very rare plant, animal, and bird species. There are xeric areas in some of the western coastal regions, but heavy rainfall can be expected inland.  The sisserou parrot, the island's national bird, is featured on the national flag. Dominica's economy is heavily dependent on both tourism and agriculture.

General Reference

 Pronunciation:  
 Common English country name: Dominica
 Official English country name: The Commonwealth of Dominica
 Common endonym(s):  
 Official endonym(s):  
 Adjectival(s): Dominican
 Demonym(s):
 Etymology: Name of Dominica
 ISO country codes: DM, DMA, 212
 ISO region codes: See ISO 3166-2:DM
 Internet country code top-level domain: .dm

Geography of Dominica

Geography of Dominica
 Dominica is: a country
 Location:
 Northern Hemisphere and Western Hemisphere
 North America (though not on the mainland)
 Atlantic Ocean
 North Atlantic
 Caribbean
 Antilles
 Lesser Antilles
 Windward Islands
 Time zone:  Eastern Caribbean Time (UTC-04)
 Extreme points of Dominica
 High:  Morne Diablotins 
 Low:  Caribbean Sea 0 m
 Land boundaries:  none
 Coastline:  148 km
 Population of Dominica: 67,000  - 195th most populous country

 Area of Dominica: 754 km2
 Atlas of Dominica

Environment of Dominica

 Climate of Dominica
 Renewable energy in Dominica
 Geology of Dominica
 Protected areas of Dominica
 Biosphere reserves in Dominica
 National parks of Dominica
 Wildlife of Dominica
 Fauna of Dominica
 Amphibians and reptiles of Dominica
 Birds of Dominica
 Butterflies of Dominica
 Decapod crustaceans of Dominica
 Mammals of Dominica
 Non-marine molluscs of Dominica

Natural geographic features of Dominica

 Bodies of water
 Bays of Dominica
 Islands of Dominica
 Lakes of Dominica
 Rivers of Dominica
 Waterfalls of Dominica
 Landforms
 Mountains of Dominica
 Volcanoes in Dominica
 Valleys of Dominica
 World Heritage Sites in Dominica

Regions of Dominica

Regions of Dominica

Ecoregions of Dominica

List of ecoregions in Dominica

Administrative divisions of Dominica
Parishes of Dominica

Municipalities of Dominica
 Capital of Dominica: Roseau
 Cities of Dominica

Demography of Dominica

Demographics of Dominica

Government and politics of Dominica

Politics of Dominica
 Form of government: parliamentary representative democratic republic
 Capital of Dominica: Roseau
 Elections in Dominica
 Political parties in Dominica

Branches of the government of Dominica

Government of Dominica

Executive branch of the government of Dominica
 Head of state: President of Dominica, Nicholas Liverpool
 Head of government: Prime Minister of Dominica, Roosevelt Skerritt
 Cabinet of Dominica

Legislative branch of the government of Dominica
 House of Assembly of Dominica (unicameral)

Judicial branch of the government of Dominica

Court system of Dominica

Foreign relations of Dominica

Foreign relations of Dominica
 Diplomatic missions in Dominica
 Diplomatic missions of Dominica

International organization membership
The Commonwealth of Dominica is a member of:

African, Caribbean, and Pacific Group of States (ACP)
Agency for the Prohibition of Nuclear Weapons in Latin America and the Caribbean (OPANAL)
Caribbean Community and Common Market (Caricom)
Caribbean Development Bank (CDB)
Commonwealth of Nations
Food and Agriculture Organization (FAO)
Group of 77 (G77)
International Bank for Reconstruction and Development (IBRD)
International Criminal Court (ICCt)
International Criminal Police Organization (Interpol)
International Development Association (IDA)
International Federation of Red Cross and Red Crescent Societies (IFRCS)
International Finance Corporation (IFC)
International Fund for Agricultural Development (IFAD)
International Labour Organization (ILO)
International Maritime Organization (IMO)
International Monetary Fund (IMF)
International Olympic Committee (IOC)
International Organization for Standardization (ISO) (subscriber)
International Red Cross and Red Crescent Movement (ICRM)

International Telecommunication Union (ITU)
International Trade Union Confederation (ITUC)
Multilateral Investment Guarantee Agency (MIGA)
Nonaligned Movement (NAM)
Organisation internationale de la Francophonie (OIF)
Organisation for the Prohibition of Chemical Weapons (OPCW)
Organization of American States (OAS)
Organization of Eastern Caribbean States (OECS)
United Nations (UN)
United Nations Conference on Trade and Development (UNCTAD)
United Nations Educational, Scientific, and Cultural Organization (UNESCO)
United Nations Industrial Development Organization (UNIDO)
Universal Postal Union (UPU)
World Confederation of Labour (WCL)
World Federation of Trade Unions (WFTU)
World Health Organization (WHO)
World Intellectual Property Organization (WIPO)
World Meteorological Organization (WMO)
World Trade Organization (WTO)

Law and order in Dominica

Law of Dominica
 Constitution of Dominica
 Crime in Dominica
 Human rights in Dominica
 LGBT rights in Dominica
 Freedom of religion in Dominica
 Dominica Police Force

Military of Dominica

Military of Dominica
 Command
 Commander-in-chief:
 Ministry of Defence of Dominica
 Forces
 Army of Dominica
 Navy of Dominica
 Air Force of Dominica
 Special forces of Dominica
 Military history of Dominica
 Military ranks of Dominica

Local government in Dominica

Local government in Dominica
Carib Territory

History of Dominica

History of Dominica
Timeline of the history of Dominica
Current events of Dominica
 Military history of Dominica

Culture of Dominica

Culture of Dominica
 Architecture of Dominica
 Cuisine of Dominica
 Festivals in Dominica
 Languages of Dominica
 Media in Dominica
 National symbols of Dominica
 Coat of arms of Dominica
 Flag of Dominica
 National anthem of Dominica
 People of Dominica
 Public holidays in Dominica
 Records of Dominica
 Religion in Dominica
 Christianity in Dominica
 Roman Catholicism in Dominica
 Hinduism in Dominica
 Islam in Dominica
 Judaism in Dominica
 Sikhism in Dominica
 World Heritage Sites in Dominica

Art in Dominica
 Art in Dominica
 Cinema of Dominica
 Literature of Dominica
 Music of Dominica
 Television in Dominica
 Theatre in Dominica

Sports in Dominica

Sports in Dominica
 Football in Dominica
 Dominica at the Olympics

Economy and infrastructure of Dominica

Economy of Dominica
 Economic rank, by nominal GDP (2007): 183rd (one hundred and eighty third)
 Agriculture in Dominica
 Banking in Dominica
 National Bank of Dominica
 Communications in Dominica
 Internet in Dominica
 Companies of Dominica
Currency of Dominica: Dollar
ISO 4217: XCD
 Energy in Dominica
 Energy policy of Dominica
 Oil industry in Dominica
 Mining in Dominica
 Tourism in Dominica
 Transportation in Dominica
 Airports in Dominica
 Rail transport in Dominica
 Roads in Dominica
 Dominica Stock Exchange

Education in Dominica

Education in Dominica
 Universities in Dominica

Health in Dominica 

 Health care in Dominica

See also

Dominica

Index of Dominica-related articles
List of Dominica-related topics
List of international rankings
Member state of the Commonwealth of Nations
Member state of the United Nations
Outline of geography
Outline of North America
Outline of the Caribbean

References

External links

Commons: Dominica

Official website of the Government of the Commonwealth of Dominica

Discover Dominica: Nature Island of the Caribbean - Official government tourism website by the Discover Dominica Authority

Dominica